The women's relay competition of the Biathlon European Championships 2012 was held on February 2, 2012 at 10:00 local time.

Results

External links
 Results

Biathlon European Championships 2012